The Division of Lalor is an Australian Electoral Division in the state of Victoria. Located in the south-western suburbs of Melbourne, it includes the south-western hub of Werribee as well as the suburbs of Hoppers Crossing, Tarneit, Truganina, Wyndham Vale and part of Point Cook.

At 9.0%, Lalor has the nation's highest proportion of children aged under 4 years old. It has the nation's lowest proportion of residents aged 65 and over (7.0%), is sixth highest nationally for families being couples with dependent children (44.4%), and has the sixth highest rate of residents purchasing their own homes (49.3%).

Geography
Since 1984, federal electoral division boundaries in Australia have been determined at redistributions by a redistribution committee appointed by the Australian Electoral Commission. Redistributions occur for the boundaries of divisions in a particular state, and they occur every seven years, or sooner if a state's representation entitlement changes or when divisions of a state are malapportioned.

History

The Division was proclaimed at the redistribution of 11 May 1949, and was first contested at the 1949 Federal election. It was named after Peter Lalor, the leader of the miners at the Eureka Stockade, and a former member of the Victorian Legislative Assembly. It is a safe seat for the Australian Labor Party, which has held it for all except three years of its existence, when it was lost in the 1966 landslide. However, a redistribution ahead of the 1969 election made it a notional Labor seat. Labor retook the seat easily and has since held it without difficulty.

It has been held by a succession of senior Labor members: Julia Gillard, Prime Minister of Australia from 2010 to 2013; Barry Jones, former Minister for Science under Bob Hawke and Labor National President; and Jim Cairns, former Treasurer and Deputy Prime Minister under Gough Whitlam. As Gillard was Deputy Prime Minister prior to becoming Prime Minister, Lalor is therefore the only federal electorate to have been held by two Deputy Prime Ministers.

The current member for Lalor since the 2013 election is Joanne Ryan.

Members

Election results

References

External links
 Division of Lalor - Australian Electoral Commission

Electoral divisions of Australia
Constituencies established in 1949
1949 establishments in Australia
City of Wyndham
Werribee, Victoria
Electoral districts and divisions of Greater Melbourne